FSIM is an acronym for:
 Formal Semantics in Moscow, an academic conference.
Fox Sports Interactive Media, the online media subsidiary of Fox Corporation's Fox Sports Media Group.

FSIM is also a filename extension for a file format in Windows
 Simulation File Format, used by Loudsoft.